MPSC may stand for:
 Military Prison Staff Corps
 Maharashtra Public Service Commission
 Manipur Public Service Commission
 Michigan Public Service Commission